Lucas Yamil José Bracco (born 11 October 1996) is an Argentine professional footballer who last played as a midfielder for Central Córdoba de Rosario in Argentina.

Career
Bracco was born in Rosario, Argentina. He began his professional football career on 11 March 2016 playing in the Scotiabank Tournament for the Chilean Primera División club Unión La Calera. He played for La Calera during the 2015–16 tournament of Chile's top-tier football league (Primera División) and in the 2016–17 Loto tournament of Chile's second-tier league (Primera B). His first goal in Chile's Primera División was for the Copa Chile competition on 9 July 2016, bringing the score to 1–0 against San Luis de Quillota, a classic rival of Unión La Calera.

On 14 February 2017, Bracco signed a professional contract with Central Córdoba de Rosario, thus joining Argentina's Primera C Metropolitana league. Central Córdoba won second place in the Primera C tournament of 2017–18.

References
 
 
 

Living people
1996 births
Argentine footballers
Footballers from Rosario, Santa Fe
Association football midfielders
Rosario Central footballers
Unión La Calera footballers
Primera B de Chile players
Argentine expatriate footballers
Argentine expatriate sportspeople in Chile
Expatriate footballers in Chile